MDA, mda, or variation, may refer to:

Places
 Moldova, a country in Europe with the ISO 3166-1 country code MDA

Politics
Meghalaya Democratic Alliance (2018), ruling coalition government in the Indian State of Meghalaya led by National People's Party
Meghalaya Democratic Alliance (2003), coalition government in the Indian State of Meghalaya led by Indian National Congress

People
 A. P. Mda (1916-1993) South African political activist
 Zakes Mda (born 1948) South African author

Companies, organizations and government bodies
 Collections Trust, formerly the Museum Documentation Association, a U.K.-based charity
 Everytown for Gun Safety or Moms Demand Action, an American group that advocates for increased gun control
 Magen David Adom (Hebrew: מגן דוד אדום, "Red Star of David"), the national aid organization of Israel and affiliate of the International Red Cross and Red Crescent Movement
 Malaysia Design Archive, an archive in Kuala Lumpur, Malaysia
 Manicaland Development Association, a former Zimbabwean NGO
 Maritime domain awareness, part of a U.S. Government inter-agency and international maritime security effort
Maxar Technologies, a Canadian-American aerospace company formerly called MDA prior to 2018
MDA (company), a Canadian aerospace technology company
Media Development Authority, a now-defunct statutory board in the Singapore government, now part of Infocomm Media Development Authority
 Medical Devices Agency, now a part of Medicines and Healthcare products Regulatory Agency
 Medical Device Authority (pihak berkusa peranti perubatan) of Malaysia
 Minnesota Department of Agriculture
 Missile Defense Agency, an agency of the US Department of Defense
 Movement for Democracy in Africa, a political party in Burkina Faso
 Muscular Dystrophy Association, an American organization that funds research into muscular dystrophy and other diseases
 Myanmar Dental Association, a professional association of Burmese dentists

Computing and technology
 Mail delivery agent, software that routes e-mail to its destination
 Mechanical design automation, a branch of computer-aided design
 Message-driven architecture, an alternative name for event-driven architecture
 Mobile document access, the retrieval of documents using a mobile computer
 Model-driven architecture, a software design approach
 Microconnect distributed antenna, a kind of transmitter/receiver
 IBM Monochrome Display Adapter (also called MDA or MDA card), a computer display standard
 Mobile digital assistant, series of T-Mobile branded PDA-like mobile phones
 MDA framework, a model used in game design to analyze games

Publications
methods, data, analyses, academic journal for survey methodology
Monthly Dragon Age, a Japanese magazine

Science and medicine
 Maternally derived antibodies, or maternal antibodies naturally acquired, a type of passive immunity
 Mean directional accuracy, metric to evaluate a forecasting method
 Minimum detectable activity, the lowest value a radiation detector can measure within the human body
 MDA5, melanoma differentiation-associated protein 5

Drugs
 Mass drug administration
 2,3-Methylenedioxyamphetamine (2,3-MDA), an amphetamine drug 
 3,4-Methylenedioxyamphetamine (3,4-MDA or tenamfetamine), an amphetamine drug known for its recreational use
 Misuse of Drugs Act 1971, an act of the Parliament of the United Kingdom
 MDA prescriptions are medical prescriptions for drugs covered by the Misuse of Drugs Act (Ireland)

Chemical compounds, procedures, and terminology 
 Malondialdehyde, organic compound with the chemical formula CH2(CHO)2
 Medium-density amorphous ice, a form of water
 Metal deactivator or metal deactivating agent, fuel additives and oil additives used to stabilize fluids by deactivating metal ions
 Multiple displacement amplification, a non-PCR based DNA amplification technique
 4,4'-Methylenedianiline, an industrial chemical
 MDa, a megadalton (one million daltons), where a dalton is a synonym for an atomic mass unit (amu)

Other meanings
 MDA (TV series), a medico-legal television show set in Australia
 Management discussion and analysis
 Mesocyclone detection algorithm, an automated software discriminator of a mesocyclone within a thunderstorm detected by Doppler weather radar
 Multiple discriminant analysis, a method for compressing a multivariate signal to yield a lower-dimensional signal amenable to classification
 IBM Monochrome Display Adapter, screen display standard
 Minimum descent altitude in an instrument approach (aviation)

See also
 MDAS